The , referred to from hereon as "Kōhaku", was aired on December 31, 2008 from NHK Hall in Japan.

The music show on New Year's Eve is broadcast on both television and radio, and divides the most popular music artists of the year into competing teams of red and white.

Hosts 
Red team host: Yukie Nakama
White team host: Masahiro Nakai
Mediators: Kazuya Matsumoto and Fumie Ono
Radio broadcasting spot person: Yasuhirio Yamada and Aika Kanda

Performers 
The singers, announced on November 25, 2008, are ordered below according to the gojūon.

Results 
The winners were the shirogumi, the white team, making it their 4th consecutive win. The white team now leads with 31 wins over the red team with 28 wins. The table below documents the voting and points distribution:

See also 
Kōhaku Uta Gassen
50th Japan Record Awards

NHK Kōhaku Uta Gassen events
NHK
K